Moatsville is an unincorporated community in Barbour County, West Virginia, United States. Moatsville has a post office with ZIP code 26405.

The community most likely was named after the local Moats family.

Moatsville runs along the Tygart River. Most well known for Moats Falls, Moatsville is a nice hang out spot for locals and nearby college students at Alderson Broaddus University. You can find many people enjoying the sun along the river on a summer day. Also along the Arden grate which runs through Moatsville, there are many woods and public hunting grounds for outdoor activities.

References

Unincorporated communities in Barbour County, West Virginia
Unincorporated communities in West Virginia